The 2013–14 season was the 106th season in the history of Northampton Town. They played their games in the fourth tier of English football, League Two and competed in the FA Cup, League Cup and the Football League Trophy.

Players

Pre-season

Competitions

League Two

League table

League position by match

Matches

FA Cup

Capital One Cup

Johnstone's Paint Trophy

Appearances, goals and cards

Transfers

Transfers in

Loans in

Loans out

Transfers out

References

Northampton Town F.C. seasons
Northampton Town